Gaetano De Sanctis (15 October 1870, Rome – 9 April 1957) was an Italian ancient historian, classicist and lifetime senator (1950-1957).
As the collection of his 'scritti minori' illustrates, his scope of scholarship ranged from Homer down to the Byzantine Empire. He was the influential teacher of Arnaldo Momigliano. His work 'Storia dei Romani' could be considered a monumental work.

De Sanctis became chair of ancient history desk at the University of Rome in 1929. In 1931, he was one of only twelve professors who refused to swear a decreed oath of allegiance to the Fascist regime (Giuramento di fedeltà al fascismo) under Benito Mussolini. As a result, his professional career was severely curtailed until after World War II.

He was governing commissar of the Italian Numismatic Institute from 1944 to 1952 and president of the "Istituto dell'Enciclopedia Italiana" (Treccani) from 1947 to 1954.

Gaetano De Sanctis is considered by many as the most eminent Roman historian of the twentieth century.

Writings 
Storia dei Romani:
I. Roma dalle origini alla monarchia, Milano-Torino, 1907
II. La conquista del primato in Italia, Milano-Torino, 1907.
III.1. L'età delle guerre puniche, Milano-Torino, 1916.
III.2. L'età delle guerre puniche, Milano-Torino, 1917.
IV.1. La fondazione dell'Impero: dalla battaglia di Naraggara alla battaglia di Pidna. Milano-Torino, 1923.
IV.2/1. Vita e pensiero nell'età delle grandi conquiste. Firenze, 1953.
IV.2/2. Dal diritto quiritario al diritto pretorio. Firenze, 1957.

His shorter works are collected and indexed as:
Scritti minori, I-VI, Roma, Edizioni di Storia e Letteratura (99, 117, 122, 125–126), 1966–1972.

Further reading 
Momigliano, A. D., 'In Memory of Gaetano De Sanctis (1870-1957)' in: idem, Studies in Modern Scholarship, ed. G. W. Bowersock and T. J. Cornell, pp. 54–71. (obituary originally published in Italian in: Rivista Storica Italiana, 69 (1957), pp. 177–195; reprinted in Momigliano's Secondo contributo (1960), pp. 299–317.)

References

External links
 

1870 births
1957 deaths
Academic staff of the Sapienza University of Rome
Italian life senators
20th-century Italian historians
Italian encyclopedists
Manifesto of the Anti-Fascist Intellectuals
Corresponding Fellows of the British Academy